Susan Firer ...
(born October 14, 1948) is an American poet who grew up along the southwestern shore of Lake Michigan in Milwaukee, WI. She was poet laureate of the city from 2008 to 2010, and from 2008 to 2014, she edited the Shepherd Express online poetry column.

Education and career 
Firer received her MA from the University of Wisconsin-Milwaukee, and in 2009 was honored as a distinguished alumnus of the University of Wisconsin. She is Adjunct Associate Professor Emeritus at the University of Wisconsin-Milwaukee.
In addition to publishing six full-length books, she has contributed to numerous local and national literary magazines and anthologies, including Best American Poetry 1992; Visiting Dr. Williams: Poems Inspired by the Life and Work of William Carlos Williams (University of Iowa Press); The Cento: A Collection of Collage Poems (Red Hen Press); and The Book of Irish American Poetry: From the Eighteenth Century to the Present (University of Notre Dame Press). Her poems have appeared in many journals, including The New Yorker, The New York Times Sunday Magazine, Ms. (magazine), Chicago Tribune, Chicago Review, jubilat,  The Georgia Review, The Iowa Review, New American Writing. Her poem "Call Me Pier" is included in the Poetry Everywhere series. Firer along with James Hazard, Bob Budny, and Jerome Kitzke performed as The Great Lakes Poem Band, a collaborative effort combining poetry and music. Sigmund Snopek has composed a song cycle based on three of Firer's poems. Most recently, two of her poems were used as texts for dance pieces choreographed by University of North Carolina at Greensboro's Head of the Department of Dance, Janet Lilly, and performed at St. Mark's Church-in-the-Bowery.

Critical reviews
Billy Collins has said, "To read the poetry of Susan Firer is to enter a unique building constructed by the imagination, like Kubla Khan's pleasure-dome, out of the shimmering material of words. These poems reveal a love of language both for its own dear sake and for its ability to deliver the news some of us cannot live without."  Wendy Vardaman similarly praises Firer's work: "Firer’s rich poetry—powerful and beautiful—creates a house whose rooms, by turns restful and invigorating, you will want to admire, borrow from, and revisit."

Books 
The Transit Of Venus, Backwaters Press, 2016
Milwaukee Does Strange Things To People: New And Selected Poems 1979-2007, Backwaters Press, 2007
The Laugh We Make When We Fall, Backwaters Press, 2002
The Lives of the Saints and Everything, Cleveland State University Press, 1993
The Underground Communion Rail, West End Press, 1992
My Life with the Tsar and Other Poems, New Rivers Press, 1979

Awards 
NEA Fellowship, 2015
University of Wisconsin Distinguished Alumnus, 2009
Council for Wisconsin Writers Lorine Niedecker Poetry Award, 2009
Milwaukee Poet Laureate, 2008-2010
Backwaters Prize, 2001
Milwaukee County Artist Award, 1996
Council for Wisconsin Writers Posner Award, 1993
Cleveland Poetry Prize, 1992
Wisconsin Arts Board Fellowship, 1979

References

External links 
 Susan Firer's website
 Poetry Foundation's Page for Susan Firer
 Poetry Everywhere's video of the poem Call Me Pier
 Woodland Pattern
 Poets & Writers Magazine

Living people
Poets Laureate of Milwaukee
University of Wisconsin–Milwaukee alumni
American women poets
1948 births
21st-century American women